C. aurantium may refer to:

 Citrus aurantium, the bitter orange, a plant species
 Cypraea aurantium, the golden cowrie, a snail species

See also
 Aurantium